Archduke Ernest of Austria (15 June 1553 – 20 February 1595) was an Austrian prince, the son of Maximilian II, Holy Roman Emperor, and Maria of Spain.

Biography 
Born in Vienna, he was educated with his brother Rudolf II, Holy Roman Emperor, in the court of Spain. In 1573 and 1587, he was a candidate for the throne of Poland. From 1576 onwards, he was governor in the Archduchy of Austria, where he promoted the Counter-Reformation. In 1590, he became governor of Inner Austria as regent for his young cousin Ferdinand, and from 1594 to 1595 he served as governor of the Spanish Netherlands.  

He died in Brussels in 1595.
He owned Pieter Bruegel the Elder surviving Months of the Year cycle [one painting High Spring (April/May) is lost]:

Ancestry

References 

Ernest, Archduke of Austria
Ernest, Archduke of Austria
Ernest, Archduke of Austria
Ernest, Archduke of Austria
Ernest, Archduke of Austria
Ernest, Archduke of Austria
Ernest, Archduke of Austria
Burials at the Cathedral of St. Michael and St. Gudula
Austrian princes
Sons of emperors
Children of Maximilian II, Holy Roman Emperor
Sons of kings